USS Sanderling (AMc-11) was a coastal minesweeper of the United States Navy.

The ship was built in 1937 as the wooden purse seiner New Conti di Savoia by the Harbor Boat Works, Terminal Island, California; was purchased for U.S. Navy use on 28 October 1940 from the New Conti di Savoia Fishing Corp., San Pedro, Los Angeles; converted to a coastal minesweeper by the Al Larson Boat Building, San Pedro, California; and placed in service as Sanderling on 18 April 1941.

World War II West Coast patrol operations 
Based at San Diego, Sanderling conducted local minesweeping and patrol operations in the 11th Naval District until placed out of service on 18 September 1944.

End of War deactivation
She was struck from the Navy List on 14 October 1944, sold back to her former owner in February 1945, and delivered to that corporation the following May.

References

External links
 
 Ships of the U.S. Navy, 1940–1945
 Ships of the U.S. Navy, 1940–1945 – USS Sanderling (AMc-11)

Minesweepers of the United States Navy
World War II minesweepers of the United States
Ships built in Los Angeles
1937 ships